Lissotestella is a genus of minute sea snails or micromolluscs, marine gastropod molluscs, unassigned in the superfamily Seguenzioidea.

Species
Species within the genus Lissotestella include:
 † Lissotestella alpha (Laws, 1939) 
 † Lissotestella basispiralis Maxwell, 1992 
 Lissotestella caelata (Powell, 1937)
 Lissotestella consobrina (Powell, 1940)
 Lissotestella cookiana Dell, 1956
 Lissotestella rissoaformis (Powell, 1931)
 Lissotestella tenuilirata (Powell, 1931)
 Lissotestella tryphenensis (Powell, 1937)
 † Lissotestella waimamakuensis Laws, 1948

References

 Powell A. W. B., New Zealand Mollusca, William Collins Publishers Ltd, Auckland, New Zealand 1979 
  Kano Y., Chikyu, E. & Warén, A. (2009) Morphological, ecological and molecular characterization of the enigmatic planispiral snail genus Adeuomphalus (Vetigastropoda: Seguenzioidea). Journal of Molluscan Studies, 75:397-418.

 
Gastropods of New Zealand
Extant Miocene first appearances